Magdalena Miklós Ilyés (born July 4, 1948 in Odorheiu Secuiesc, Romania) is a former Romanian handball player who competed in the 1976 Summer Olympics.

She was part of the Romanian handball team, which finished fourth in the Olympic tournament. She played all five matches and scored fourteen goals.

References

1948 births
Living people
People from Odorheiu Secuiesc
Romanian female handball players
Olympic handball players of Romania
Romanian sportspeople of Hungarian descent
Handball players at the 1976 Summer Olympics